Renata M. M. Wentzcovitch is a condensed matter physicist, known for her work on simulating materials at the  quantum-mechanical level, including participating in the Quantum ESPRESSO project. Her work has focused mainly on materials at extreme pressure and temperature conditions typical of planetary interiors. She is a professor of material science and applied physics and of earth and environmental science at Columbia University.

Wentzcovitch has a Ph.D. from the University of California, Berkeley. Before joining the Columbia University faculty, she worked at the University of Minnesota.
She is a Fellow of the American Physical Society and the American Association for the Advancement of Science, and in 2013 was elected to the American Academy of Arts and Sciences.

References

External links

Year of birth missing (living people)
Living people
Brazilian physicists
University of California, Berkeley alumni
University of Minnesota faculty
Columbia University faculty
Fellows of the American Academy of Arts and Sciences
Fellows of the American Physical Society
Fellows of the American Geophysical Union
Fellows of the American Association for the Advancement of Science